Ravikant Shukla (born 9 July 1987) is an Indian first class cricketer.

Career 
He played at the U-16 and U-19 cricket for Uttar Pradesh cricket team. He captained the India U19 national cricket team at the 2006 U-19 Cricket World Cup where India emerged as runners-up to Pakistan in the final. During the tournament, he scored 53 runs in 6 matches.

Ravikant made his first-class debut at the age of 18 for Uttar Pradesh.

References

External links

1987 births
Living people
Indian cricketers
Uttar Pradesh cricketers
Goa cricketers
Central Zone cricketers
People from Ballia